The Goulandris-class were a series of two coastal patrol boats built by the Neorion shipyard and donated to the Hellenic Navy in 1975 and 1977 respectively. They were 40-ton, 24-metre boats, powered by two 1350 hp diesel engines, and armed with a 20 mm gun.

Ships
 Goulandris I (P-289) was built at the Neorion shipyard and donated to the Hellenic Navy. She was commissioned on 25 June 1975, and decommissioned in 1990.
 Goulandris II (P-290), was also built at the Neorion shipyard and donated to the Hellenic Navy on 25 April 1977. She was destroyed by fire and sunk south of Lesbos Island without casualties on 24 June 1983.

References

Patrol vessels of the Hellenic Navy
Ships built in Greece
Patrol boat classes